James Douglas Kaprielian (born March 2, 1994) is an American professional baseball pitcher for the Oakland Athletics of Major League Baseball (MLB). He attended the University of California, Los Angeles (UCLA), where he played college baseball for the UCLA Bruins, and was drafted by the New York Yankees with the 16th pick in the first round of the 2015 MLB draft.

Amateur career
Kaprielian attended Arnold O. Beckman High School in Irvine, California. During his career he went 33–3 with a 0.96 earned run average (ERA) and 250 strikeouts. He was drafted by the Seattle Mariners in the 40th round of the 2012 MLB draft. He did not sign with the Mariners and enrolled at the University of California, Los Angeles (UCLA) to play college baseball for the UCLA Bruins. As a freshman in 2013, Kaprielian appeared in 34 games as a relief pitcher, recording a 1.55 ERA with 53 strikeouts. In 2013, he played collegiate summer baseball in the Cape Cod Baseball League for the Yarmouth-Dennis Red Sox, and was named a league all-star. As a sophomore, he was converted into a starter. He started 15 games, going 7–6 with a 2.29 ERA and 108 strikeouts.

On May 15, 2015, Kaprielian combined with David Berg for the first no-hitter in UCLA history. Kaprielian pitched the first nine innings and Berg pitched the tenth inning to complete the no-hitter.

Professional career

New York Yankees
Kaprielian was considered one of the top prospects for the 2015 MLB draft, and was selected by the New York Yankees in the first round, with the 16th overall selection. He signed with the Yankees, receiving a $2.65 million signing bonus, and spent his first professional season with both the GCL Yankees and Staten Island Yankees, posting a combined 0–1 record and 3.97 ERA in  total innings between both teams.

Kaprielian received a non-roster invitation to spring training in 2016. He began the season with the Tampa Yankees, but only played in three games due to an elbow injury.

In 2017, Kaprielian's elbow discomfort began to persist, and he began the season on the disabled list. On April 13, 2017, he underwent Tommy John surgery to repair a torn ulnar collateral ligament, putting him away for the year.

Oakland Athletics
On July 31, 2017, the Yankees traded Kaprielian to the Oakland Athletics, along with fellow prospects Jorge Mateo and Dustin Fowler, for Sonny Gray. The Athletics added him to their 40-man roster after the 2018 season. Kaprielian made his debut with the High-A Stockton Ports on May 19, 2019. He accumulated a 4.46 ERA in  innings with a 43:8 K-to-BB ratio before the Athletics promoted him to the Double-A Midland RockHounds on July 23.

On August 16, 2020, Kaprielian made his MLB debut with two innings against the San Francisco Giants. He allowed a home run to the first batter he faced, Brandon Crawford, and struck out one. He spent most of the season at the Athletics' alternate training site in San Jose and only pitched in two games of mop-up duty with the Athletics, allowing three runs in  innings of work.

On May 12, 2021, injuries in the rotation led to Kaprielian receiving a call-up to make his first MLB start at Fenway Park against the Boston Red Sox. With his father and uncle in attendance, Kaprielian was rewarded with the win, allowing one run in five innings with six strikeouts in a 4–1 victory for the Athletics. On July 27, Kaprielian collected his first career base hit, notching a single against San Diego Padres pitcher Chris Paddack. Kaprielian finished the 2021 season with an 8–5 record, a 4.07 ERA and 123 strikeouts in  innings.

Kaprielian was kept out of the start of the 2022 season with an injury. He made his season debut on May 1, 2022 against the Cleveland Guardians.

Personal life
Kaprielian's mother, Barbara Kaprielian, died of breast cancer in 2014 after her 14-year battle.

Kaprielian is of Armenian descent.

References

External links

UCLA Bruins bio

1994 births
Living people
American people of Armenian descent
Baseball players from California
Gulf Coast Yankees players
Las Vegas Aviators players
Major League Baseball pitchers
Midland RockHounds players
Oakland Athletics players
People from Laguna Hills, California
Scottsdale Scorpions players
Staten Island Yankees players
Stockton Ports players
Tampa Yankees players
UCLA Bruins baseball players
Yarmouth–Dennis Red Sox players
Ethnic Armenian sportspeople